"He's a Doll" is a song by American girl group the Honeys that was written and produced by the Beach Boys' Brian Wilson. It was released as their fourth single on April 13, 1964, with the B-side "The Love of a Boy and Girl".

Background
According to Marilyn Wilson-Rutherford, "Brian would always notice when we saw a cute guy we would say, 'He's such a doll' so he picked up on it and wrote one of the great songs for us. We feel it’s a classic with The Wrecking Crew jamming too. That track and arrangement is amazing!" She regarded it as the definitive song by the group, particularly for "the energy and the commitment of young imagination of the perfect boyfriend."

The song was heavily influenced by Phil Spector productions such as "Be My Baby" (1963) and features the same verse chord progression as "Da Doo Ron Ron" (1963). Diane Rovell remembered, "We had a ball doing 'He's a Doll' [...] That was our attempt at the Angels/Shangri-Las sound."

Cover versions
 1993 – Sonic Surf City, He's a Doll

References

1964 singles
The Honeys songs
Songs written by Brian Wilson
Song recordings produced by Brian Wilson
Warner Records singles
1964 songs